Henry Joost (born October 30, 1982) is a German-born American filmmaker, whose work includes directing, with Ariel Schulman, the films Catfish, Paranormal Activity 3, Paranormal Activity 4, Nerve and Project Power. Henry is married to actress Sofia Black-D'Elia.

Career
In 2018, Joost co-directed the Netflix sci-fi superhero thriller film Project Power alongside Ariel Schulman from a screenplay by Mattson Tomlin. The film stars Jamie Foxx, Joseph Gordon-Levitt and Dominique Fishback. It was released on August 14, 2020.

Filmography (With Ariel Schulman)
Film
 Paranormal Activity 3 (2011)
 Paranormal Activity 4 (2012)
 Nerve (2016)
 Viral (2016)
 Project Power (2020)
 Secret Headquarters (2022) (Also writer)

Documentary films

Television

References

External links 

 

Place of birth missing (living people)
American film producers
American film directors
Horror film directors
Living people
1981 births